Stoyan Zlatev (born 2 August 1954) is a Bulgarian modern pentathlete. He competed at the 1976 Summer Olympics.

References

1954 births
Living people
Bulgarian male modern pentathletes
Olympic modern pentathletes of Bulgaria
Modern pentathletes at the 1976 Summer Olympics